Rodrigo Carrasco (born 18 October 1975) is a Chilean equestrian. He competed in two events at the 2012 Summer Olympics.

References

1975 births
Living people
Chilean male equestrians
Olympic equestrians of Chile
Equestrians at the 2012 Summer Olympics
Equestrians at the 2011 Pan American Games
Sportspeople from Santiago
Pan American Games competitors for Chile
21st-century Chilean people